Author name disambiguation is a type of disambiguation and record linkage applied to the names of individual people. The process could, for example, distinguish individuals with the name "John Smith".

An editor may apply the process to scholarly documents where the goal is to find all mentions of the same author and cluster them together. Authors of scholarly documents often share names which makes it hard to distinguish each author's work. Hence, author name disambiguation aims to find all publications that belong to a given author and distinguish them from publications of other authors who share the same name.

Methods
Considerable research has been conducted to do disambiguation. Typical approaches for author name disambiguation rely on information about the authors such as their affiliations, email addresses, year of publication, co-authors, topic information to distinguish between authors. This information can be used to train a machine learning classifier to decide whether two author mentions refer to the same author or not. Many research works regard name disambiguation as a clustering problem, i.e., partitioning documents into some clusters, where each represents an author. Others regard it as a classification problem. Some works construct document graph and utilize the graph topology to learn document similarity. Recently, several research works  aim to learn low-dimensional document representation by employing network embedding methods.

Applications

There are multiple reasons that cause author names to be ambiguous, among which: individuals may publish under multiple names for a variety of reasons including different transliteration, misspelling, name change due to marriage, or the use of nicknames or middle names and initials.

Motivations for disambiguating individuals include identifying inventors from patents. Name disambiguation is also a cornerstone in author-centric academic search and mining systems, such as ArnetMiner (also AMiner)
.

Similar issues
Author name disambiguation is only one record linkage problem in the scholarly data domain. Closely related, and potentially mutually beneficial problems include: organisation (affiliation) disambiguation, as well as conference or publication venue disambiguation, since data publishers often use different names or aliases for these entities.

Resources

Several well-known benchmarks to evaluate author name disambiguation are listed below, each of which provides publications with some ambiguous names and their ground truths.
 AMiner name disambiguation dataset
 CiteSeerX name disambiguation dataset
 Semantic Scholar Author Name Disambiguation (S2AND) dataset
Source Codes
 Beard
 Name disambiguation in AMiner

References

Word-sense disambiguation
Library cataloging and classification
Metadata
Data management